A percept in the information technology industry is a term used in the pricing of data transfer. For example, rather than charging an individual (who is remotely retrieving data from say a weather sensor or a GPS device) by the size of the data, a company would charge that individual by the percept.  Here a percept would constitute a statistical data point, such as a GPS location. Pricing per percept would mean that a customer or individual using that GPS device would actually be charged per unit of true economic value to him/her, a GPS location datapoint, rather than on the size of that datapoint in bits/bytes/kilobytes, etc.

References

Data transmission
Pricing